Clepsis ketmenana is a species of moth of the family Tortricidae. It is found in Kazakhstan.

References

Moths described in 1962
Clepsis